Myrmekiaphila is a genus of North American mygalomorph trapdoor spiders in the family Euctenizidae, and was first described by G. F. Atkinson in 1886. All described species are endemic to the southeastern United States.

Originally placed with the Ctenizidae, it was moved to the wafer trapdoor spiders in 1985, then to the Euctenizidae in 2012. Myrmekiaphila appears as the sister group to all southwestern Euctenizidae with the exception of Apomastus, which in turn is the sister group to all euctenizines. M. flavipes was transferred from Aptostichus in 2007.

Description
The known species of this genus resemble each other in appearance and behavior. Females are uniformly colored, with some dusky stripes on the dorsum of the abdomen. Colors range from yellowish red to dark reddish brown. The palpal tibia of the males are modified in a way that distinguishes them from other mygalomorph spiders of North America. The first legs in males are modified as mating claspers.

All members live in subterranean, silk-lined burrows covered by a silken-soil trap door. Some species construct side chambers that can be closed off by secondary trap doors, a unique feature among Cyrtaucheniidae. While the related Promyrmekiaphila and Aptostichus also build side chambers, they do not close them with trap doors.

G. F. Atkinson collected his specimens while hunting for ants, often finding them in close proximity to ant nests.

Species
 it contains twelve species restricted to the southeastern United States, but found in a wide variety of habitats. These range from northern Virginia along the Appalachian Mountains southward through West Virginia, Kentucky, North and South Carolina, Tennessee and northern Georgia into the southeastern plain of Alabama, Mississippi Florida, and the temperate deciduous forest of central Texas with dry climates and relatively high altitudes.
Myrmekiaphila comstocki Bishop & Crosby, 1926 – USA
Myrmekiaphila coreyi Bond & Platnick, 2007 – USA
Myrmekiaphila flavipes (Petrunkevitch, 1925) – USA
Myrmekiaphila fluviatilis (Hentz, 1850) – USA
Myrmekiaphila foliata Atkinson, 1886 (type) – USA
Myrmekiaphila howelli Bond & Platnick, 2007 – USA
Myrmekiaphila jenkinsi Bond & Platnick, 2007 – USA
Myrmekiaphila millerae Bond & Platnick, 2007 – USA
Myrmekiaphila minuta Bond & Platnick, 2007 – USA
Myrmekiaphila neilyoungi Bond & Platnick, 2007 – USA
Myrmekiaphila tigris Bond & Ray, 2012 – USA
Myrmekiaphila torreya Gertsch & Wallace, 1936 – USA

Three species groups are currently recognized. These are only intended to facilitate identification based on the male palp; it is not known if they represent monophyletic taxa. M. flavipes is only known from females and thus not grouped.

 foliata group
 Myrmekiaphila comstocki Bishop & Crosby, 1926
 Myrmekiaphila coreyi Bond & Platnick, 2007
 Myrmekiaphila foliata Atkinson, 1886
 Myrmekiaphila tigris Bond et al., 2012

 fluviatilis group
 Myrmekiaphila fluviatilis (Hentz, 1850)
 Myrmekiaphila howelli Bond & Platnick, 2007
 Myrmekiaphila jenkinsi Bond & Platnick, 2007
 Myrmekiaphila millerae Bond & Platnick, 2007
 Myrmekiaphila neilyoungi Bond & Platnick, 2007
 Myrmekiaphila torreya Gertsch & Wallace, 1936

 minuta group
 Myrmekiaphila minuta Bond & Platnick, 2007

 unplaced species
 Myrmekiaphila flavipes (Petrunkevitch, 1925)

References

Euctenizidae
Mygalomorphae genera
Spiders of the United States